The women's 4 × 400 metres relay event at the 2003 Asian Athletics Championships was held in Manila, Philippines on September 23.

Results

References

2003 Asian Athletics Championships
Relays at the Asian Athletics Championships
2003 in women's athletics